Oldřich Hanč (22 March 1915 – 2 December 1989) was a Czech speed skater. He competed in three events at the 1936 Winter Olympics.

References

External links
 

1915 births
1989 deaths
Czech male speed skaters
Olympic speed skaters of Czechoslovakia
Speed skaters at the 1936 Winter Olympics
Sportspeople from Plzeň